Pammenes may refer to:
 Pammenes of Thebes
 Pammenes of Marathon